Gunston is a surname. Notable people with the surname include:

Bill Gunston (1927–2013), aviation and military author
Jack Gunston (born 1991), Australian rules footballer
Gunston baronets
Sir Derrick Gunston, 1st Baronet (1891–1985), British politician
Sir John Gunston, 3rd Baronet (born 1962), English photographer

Fictional characters
Norman Gunston, a satirical TV character performed by Australian actor and comedian Garry McDonald